Wilibald Artus (1811 - 7 February 1880) was a professor of philosophy at the University of Jena and editor of the Allgemeine Pharmaceutische Zeitschrift. He is noted for his work Hand-Atlas sammtlicher medicinisch-pharmaceutischer Gewachse (1848) with engravings by F. Kirchner. This botanical work was intended for use by pharmacists, doctors and druggists.

References

1811 births
1880 deaths
Academic staff of the University of Jena